UQU or Uqu may refer to:

 Umm al-Qura University, a university in Saudi Arabia
 University of Queensland Union, a university student organization in Australia
 Unquadunium, an unsynthesized chemical element with atomic number 141 and symbol Uqu